Ipanema Atlético Clube is an amateur Brazilian football club based in Santana do Ipanema, Alagoas. The team last participated in the Campeonato Alagoano Segunda Divisão in the 2017 season.

History
The club was founded on 5 May 1923, as Ipanema Sport Club, eventually being renamed to Ipanema Atlético Clube. Ipanema lost the 1992 Campeonato Alagoano to CRB.

Stadium
Ipanema Atlético Clube play their home games at Estádio Governador Arnon de Melo. The stadium has a maximum capacity of 6,000 people.

Honours
Campeonato Alagoano Second Division: 1989, 2014

References

Association football clubs established in 1923
Football clubs in Alagoas
1923 establishments in Brazil